Trinity-St. Stephen's United Church is the largest United Church in Amherst, Nova Scotia, and is located at 1 Ratchford Street. The church was formed by the union of Trinity Methodist Church and St. Stephen's Presbyterian Church. The first joined service of the two churches, held in today's church building, was on July 6, 1936. The Fort Lawrence congregation joined with Trinity-St. Stephen's in 1957.

There are currently 400 members of the church.

The current minister of the church is Rev. Nigel Weaver. Jeff Joudrey is the current Organist and Music/Choir director.

External links
Trinity-St. Stephen's United Church Website

Churches completed in 1936
20th-century Protestant churches
United Church of Canada churches in Nova Scotia
20th-century United Church of Canada church buildings
Buildings and structures in Cumberland County, Nova Scotia
Amherst, Nova Scotia